Helen Marion Walker (July 17, 1920 – March 10, 1968) was an American actress.

Biography

1920–1940: Early life
Helen Marion Walker was born July 17, 1920, in Worcester, Massachusetts, the daughter of Irish-American parents. According to Walker, she grew up "quite poor." Her father, who managed a grocery store, died when she was six years old, and she and her two sisters went to live on a farm in Upton, Massachusetts. Her mother took a job working in a department store but later suffered a nervous breakdown.

Walker's initial acting experience came in high school, performing in school plays. She won a scholarship to the Erskine School of Dramatics in Boston and completed one semester of studies, but she withdrew after completing her first play, embarrassed by her performance.

1941–1946: Career beginnings and film
After dropping out of the Erskine School of Dramatics, Walker began to appear in local stock theater. On Broadway, she portrayed Lisa Otis in Jason (1942). She married Paramount lawyer Robert Blumofe on November 19, 1942, in Tijuana, Mexico, but the marriage ended in divorce in 1946. 

Walker made her film debut in 1942's Lucky Jordan, a comedy starring Alan Ladd. She earned a solid reputation playing leading roles in comedies as what she termed a "reactress," a straight man to comic leads in films such as Brewster's Millions and Murder, He Says, both released in 1945.

According to Yvonne de Carlo, Walker, "the good natured but tough talking starlet," took Gail Russell "under her wing and introduced her to the tranquilizing benefits of vodka" when they were both under contract to Paramount. Russell subsequently became an alcoholic.

1947–1955: Auto accident and career decline

Walker had just finished filming Her Adventurous Night (1946) and was set to begin Heaven Only Knows when an auto accident drastically disrupted her career. On December 31, 1946, while driving a convertible coupe belonging to director Bruce "Lucky" Humberstone from Palm Springs to Hollywood on U.S. Route 99, she picked up three hitchhikers: first, a soldier named Robert E. Lee, and later 18-year-old students Philip Mercado and Joseph Montalde. Near Redlands, California, the car slid off the road into a dirt division strip and rolled for more than 300 feet, flipping over as many as seven times and ejecting all four passengers. Lee was killed as his head struck the pavement, and Walker and the other two passengers were seriously injured. Walker suffered fractures to her pelvis and clavicle as well as a crushed foot, and spent more than a month in the hospital. Montalde sued Walker for $100,000. A coroner's jury found that Walker had been driving negligently. She was charged with manslaughter for Lee's death, but the charge was later dismissed for lack of evidence. Walker was replaced in Heaven Only Knows by Marjorie Reynolds.

Despite the accident and her legal troubles, Walker continued to act, and she appeared in perhaps her most famous role as the duplicitous psychoanalyst in the original version of Nightmare Alley (1947) with Tyrone Power. She also took prominent roles in films such as Call Northside 777 (1948) with James Stewart, My Dear Secretary (1948) with Kirk Douglas and Impact (1949).

In 1950, Walker married department-store executive Edward DuDomaine, but the couple divorced in 1952.

Following starring roles in My True Story (1951) and Problem Girls (1953), Walker made her final film appearance in Joseph H. Lewis's film noir The Big Combo with Cornel Wilde in 1955. She retired from acting at the age of 35.

1956–1968: Post-acting
In 1960, after Walker's house was destroyed by fire, several other Hollywood actresses held a benefit to assist her.

Death
Walker died of cancer following a nine-year illness on March 10, 1968, in the North Hollywood section of Los Angeles, California at the age of 47.

Political views  
A Democrat, Walker supported Adlai Stevenson's campaign during the 1952 presidential election.

Filmography

Film

Television

References

Sources

External links

 
 
 

1920 births
1968 deaths
20th-century American actresses
Actresses from Worcester, Massachusetts
American film actresses
American stage actresses
American people of Irish descent
Deaths from cancer in California
California Democrats
Massachusetts Democrats